Abrahamyan and its variants Abrahamian and Aprahamian in Western Armenian is an Armenian surname. Notable people with the surname include:

Abrahamyan 
 Alyosha Abrahamyan (1945–2018), Armenian footballer
 Avetik Abrahamyan (born 1980), Armenian-German professional boxer known as Arthur Abraham
 Harutyun Abrahamyan (born 2004), basketball player
 Hovik Abrahamyan (born 1958), Armenian politician
 Khoren Abrahamyan (1930–2004), Armenian actor and film director
 Tatev Abrahamyan (born 1988), American chess player

Abrahamian 
 Ara Abrahamian (born 1975), Armenian-Swedish sport wrestler
 Atossa Araxia Abrahamian (born 1986), Swiss-American journalist
 Bob Abrahamian (1978–2014), American-Armenian soul music deejay, historian, archivist, and record collector.
 Ervand Abrahamian (born 1940), American historian
 Mark Abrahamian (1966–2012), American musician
 Paul Abrahamian (1993), Big Brother Season 18 Contestant

Aprahamian 
 Felix Aprahamian (1914–2005), British music critic, writer, concert promoter
 Pablo Aprahamian (born 1985), Uruguayan judoka of Armenian descent

See also 
 Abramyan (disambiguation)

References 

Armenian-language surnames
Patronymic surnames